Mark Knowles and Daniel Nestor were the defending champions, but Nestor chose not to participate this year. Knowles team up with Jim Grabb, but lost in the first round to Jonas Björkman and Pat Rafter. 

Mahesh Bhupathi and Leander Paes won the title, by defeating Ellis Ferreira and Rick Leach 6–4, 4–6, 7–6 in the final.

Seeds
Champion seeds are indicated in bold text while text in italics indicates the round in which those seeds were eliminated.

Draw

Finals

Top half

Bottom half

References

Men's Doubles